Chris Bortz (born September 10, 1973) is a politician from Cincinnati, Ohio. He was elected to the Cincinnati City Council in 2005 as a member of the Charter Party. Because the Charter Party is not recognized by the state of Ohio as an official party, Bortz is a registered Republican.  He currently serves as the chair of the council's Strategic Growth Committee.  Bortz was born in Cincinnati and attended Cincinnati Country Day School for high school; he attended Tufts University for his undergraduate education, and received a J.D. from the University of Arizona.  Before his time on the City Council, Bortz served on the Charter Committee Board since 1997, as well as the Cincinnati Electoral Reform Commission, a panel created to study Cincinnati government.

Early career

Bortz attended high school at Cincinnati Country Day School and later went on to graduate from Tufts University in Boston and studied Jacobean theater at the British American Drama Academy. Upon finishing college, Bortz became a teacher at Country Day for sixth-grade English and 8th grade Philosophy. He accepted a position as the Dean of Faculty for Summerbridge Cincinnati, a summer school program designed to give academically qualified, yet underprivileged students the opportunity to advance their education in a rigorous, nurturing academic environment. Besides his role as teacher and Dean of Faculty for Summerbridge, Chris also coached the football, track, baseball and wrestling teams.

After graduating from law school at the University of Arizona in Tucson, Bortz moved to Cincinnati and took on a new role at Towne Properties (a real estate developer) as General Counsel and Special Projects Director.  He worked on converting the historic Shillito’s department store into modern residential living. On this and many other projects, Chris worked closely with his uncle, Arn Bortz, who served nine years on the Cincinnati City Council and one term as Mayor of Cincinnati in the early 1980s. His work at Towne Properties has raised controversy where it intersects with his service on the council—a local attorney has pushed for censure of Bortz, since Towne Properties may benefit from a tax increment financing district passed by the council (Bortz abstained from the vote). The same issue has also plagued his vote on Cincinnati's streetcar system, which would serve several properties owned by the company.

Cincinnati City Council 2005–2011

Bortz was a co-founder of the GO Cincinnati plan for economic development.  In May 2006, he signed onto a motion along with Laketa Cole that created an automatic tax exemption for LEED Certified Silver, Gold, or Platinum standards in order to encourage more sustainable development in Cincinnati.  The motion created a Community Development Block Grant as well to help finance structures for builders.   He has also been a major advocate for shared services, sitting on the steering committee for GCEP (Government Cooperation and Efficiency Project)  In April 2008, Bortz signed onto the motion that moved for $50,000 be allocated for a professional services contact with the Regional Planning Commission in order to match Hamilton County's $50,000.  The goal of the motion was to not create a regional government, but to reduce the cost of government while also improving the quality of services provided. In September 2010, Councilman Bortz signed on to a motion to increase economic development in and attract businesses to Cincinnati to enter into a contractual agreement with the Port Authority to implement the GO Cincinnati Plan.  As the motion stated, "the Port Authority will become the catalytic development corporation tasked with concentrating development expertise and financial resources required to implement GO Cincinnati, creating jobs and private investment in the City of Cincinnati.

Bortz ran for reelection in 2011 and received 22,044 votes. He received the tenth most votes out of nine possible spots on city council, and was not re-elected.

Professional achievements

Board memberships
Electoral Reform Commission Member

Breakthrough Collaborative Board Member

Cincinnati Country Day School Board Member

Jewish Community Relations Council Board Member

References

Living people
Cincinnati City Council members
Charter Party politicians
Tufts University alumni
James E. Rogers College of Law alumni
1973 births